Major General Sir Richard Granville Hylton Howard-Vyse  (27 June 1883 – 5 December 1962) was a cavalry officer in the British Army.

Howard-Vyse served in the First World War commanding the 10th Cavalry Brigade, and in the Second World War as the Head of British Military Mission to French High Command between 1939 and 1940. He was invested as a Knight Commander Order of St Michael and St George and awarded the Distinguished Service Order. He also held the office of Deputy Lieutenant of Buckinghamshire, and was a Justice of the Peace.

Early life
Richard Granville Hylton Howard-Vyse was born on 27 June 1883, the son of Howard Henry Howard-Vyse and Mabel Diana Howard-Vyse of Stoke Poges Buckinghamshire. He had two siblings, George Cecil Howard-Vyse died, and Lilly Eleanor Howard-Vyse.

Military career
Howard-Vyse was commissioned as a second-lieutenant in the Royal Horse Guards in December 1902. Five years later, in 1907, he was a lieutenant and made regimental adjutant in September 1907. In March the following year he relinquished being adjutant,
and in April was promoted to captain.

Now a captain, Howard-Vyse attended the British Army's Staff College, Camberley from January 1911. After Staff College he became a brigade major for the 5th Cavalry Brigade, still ranked as a captain, in May 1914. By July 1915 he was a General Staff officer 2nd Grade, still with the 5th Cavalry Brigade.

On 1917, following a request from General Edmund Allenby Howard-Vyse was sent to the Middle East as the Chief Staff Officer for the Desert Mounted Corps, with the brevet rank of lieutenant colonel and the temporary rank of brigadier general. For his service he was made a Companion of the Order of St Michael and St George in April 1918. Then in July 1918 he assumed the command of the 10th Cavalry Brigade.

Post war
Howard-Vyse became the next commandant of the Zeitoun School of Instruction, in Cairo.  It was followed by command of his regiment the Royal Horse Guards from 1922 to 1926.  It was at Cairo that he married his fiancée, Phyllis Hermione, daughter of Francis Saxham Elwas Drury, on 15 October 1925.  He returned to the War Office in 1927 as a grade 1 General Staff officer; and thence was sent to Egypt in 1928 as the commander of the Cairo Cavalry Brigade.  His next appointment was the Inspector of Cavalry and commandant of the Equitation School from 1930 to 1934.  He was then made the chief of staff to Prince Henry, Duke of Gloucester for his tour of Australia, being awarded a knighthood.

Later career
Howard-Vyse retired from the army in 1935, and in November 1937 was admitted to the King's Bench Division of the High Court of Justice and became the High Sheriff of Buckinghamshire. He became the Honorary Colonel of the 99th (Buckinghamshire and Berkshire Yeomanry) Field Regiment, Royal Artillery from 1938.

He was recalled up to military service, with a special appointment, in August 1939, becoming the head of British Military Mission to the French High Command and returning to the reserve list when he relinquished his special appointment in July 1940. On 14 June 1940, Howard-Vyse was told by Alanbrooke to fly home to London to explain to John Dill (CIGS) that the proposed Brittany Defence Scheme (Redoubt) was quite impossible,and all British troops should be evacuated from France as quickly as possible. Later that day at Le Mans (the L of C HQ) Alanbrooke had a difficult phone call from Dill and then Churchill before Churchill agreed.

In June 1950 he was removed from the reserve list by reason of age, and became the honorary colonel of the Royal Horse Guards in July 1951. As such, for the Coronation of Queen Elizabeth II he was the Gold Stick in Waiting. Sir Richard Granville Hylton Howard-Vyse died on 5 December 1962.

See also
 Royal Horse Guards
 British Cavalry
 British Army
 First World War
 South African War
 Boer War

References

External links
Generals of World War II

1883 births
1962 deaths
British Army major generals
British Army cavalry generals of World War I
British Army generals of World War II
Companions of the Distinguished Service Order
Deputy Lieutenants of Buckinghamshire
High Sheriffs of Buckinghamshire
Knights Commander of the Order of St Michael and St George
People from Buckinghamshire (before 1974)
Royal Horse Guards officers
English justices of the peace
Graduates of the Staff College, Camberley